The BAW Yuanbao (北汽制造 元宝) is an all-electric city car manufactured by BAW since 2021. Originally launched as the Change Mini EV, the model was later relaunched as the Yanling S3 and later, the BAW Yuanbao in 2022.

Overview
The BAW Yuanbao was first launched in September 2021 as the Change (嫦娥) Mini EV, named after Chinese moon goddess Chang'e. It was discovered that the Change Mini EV was later declaired as the Yanling S3 (燕玲S3) by April 2022 despite already being sold as the Change Mini EV in the Chinese market. At the same time, the official marketing campaign continue to tease the upcoming model as the BAW S3 and Yuanbao. The Yuanbao was intended to be a competitor of the slightly smaller and similarly shaped Wuling Hongguang Mini EV and Chery QQ Ice Cream.

Specifications
The front suspensions are MacPherson struts and the rear suspensions are Multi-link suspensions.

See also
 Wuling Hongguang Mini EV, another similar electric microcar 
 Chery QQ Ice Cream, another similar electric microcar

References

Production electric cars
Yuanbao
Cars introduced in 2021
Cars of China